also known at St. Agnes' University, is a private women's college with campuses in Kyoto, Kyoto and Takatsuki, Osaka in Japan.

The university's foundation history can be traced through the establishment of St. Agnes' School to 1875.  The university received its official charter as an accredited four year university in 2000. The university is an affiliated educational institution of the Nippon Sei Ko Kai, the province of the Anglican Communion in Japan.

See also
Anglican Church in Japan
Channing Moore Williams

References

External links
 Official website 

Educational institutions established in 2000
Private universities and colleges in Japan
Universities and colleges in Kyoto Prefecture
Universities and colleges in Osaka Prefecture
Anglican Church in Japan
2000 establishments in Japan
Christian universities and colleges in Japan
Women's universities and colleges in Japan